Kirakira is the provincial capital of the Makira-Ulawa Province in Solomon Islands. Kirakira is located on the north coast of Makira (formerly San Cristobal), the largest island of the province.

The Kirakira Airport is served by Solomon Airlines, which provides flights to Honiara and other destinations. The airport is a grass strip and receives flights four times per week. Solomon Airlines, the national carrier, flies in and out of Kira Kira. It is a 45-minute flight from Honiara. Planes landing at the airport vary in size from a 6-seat Islander to a 36-seat Dash 8 twin turboprop. If there is too much rain, the airstrip can be too muddy to allow planes to safely land.

The capital, KiraKira, is a small township of approximately 3,500 people. The premier, Thomas Weipe, is the local Makira-Ulawa representative for Solomon Islands parliament. His office is in KiraKira. KiraKira does have electricity and running water. The electricity is produced by a diesel generator. There are often periods where there is no power each day for 1–2 hours while the generator is maintained. The town is nestled on the bay opposite the airport. Most people live in traditional Solomon Island houses. There is mobile phone coverage in KiraKira that allows for talk and text communication but not mobile Internet services. The Internet can usually only be accessed at the post office. Despite an annual rainfall in excess of 3 metres, there are challenges associated with securing the water supply for the town. A centerpiece for the community is a full-sized soccer oval.

90% of the population on the island are Christian with various denominations including Roman Catholic, South Pacific Christian and 7th day Adventist churches found in the community. The majority of the population lives in rugged terrain in villages on the slopes of the mountains which are covered in dense jungle and rise along the spine of Makira Island.

A range of languages and dialects spoken in Kirakira. Pidgin English is spoken by the local Islanders. English is the official language used by the staff at the hospital and in the schools.

Education 
There are primary and secondary schools in KiraKira. Primary school education is compulsory. There is a large government boarding school on Makira Island that takes students to year 12 from all over Solomon Islands. Students sleep in bunk beds in dormitories that hold about 40 students. The fees at government-funded boarding schools are modest but still a challenge for Solomon Islanders, approximately $2,000SBD (approximately US$250) for board and tuition for a year at a public boarding school in the Solomon Islands. There is no formal tertiary or trade education in Kirakira. Students must leave the island to gain further qualifications after leaving school.

Economy 
Government salaries for positions in the Solomon Islands are very low in comparison to advanced economies. A school principal or medical doctoris likely to be earning around $80,000 SBD per annum (about US$10,000) and the nursing and other staff in the hospital are earning much less. The cost of living, however, is very high compared to the salaries earned. In Kirakira, a can of soft drink costs $8–10 SBD and a 1.5-litre bottle of water costs $12 SBD. Petrol is very expensive in the Solomon Islands at around $90 SBD ($11 USD) per US gallon. The average person in the Solomon Islands will not have many possessions - car ownership is an impossible aspiration. The majority of the economy is non-monetary with approximately 80% of the population engaged in subsistence farming. Fishing is another industry. Fresh fish can be found each morning, along with fruit and vegetables, which are sold from the markets which are located on the bay in the center of KiraKira.

The diet available in KiraKira is traditional and this may have ensured that the problem of obesity, that is very common in other Melanesian communities, is not as big a problem yet. There is concern that the diet is changing, with more cheap processed foods, such as "two-minute noodles" becoming available in the stores, and this might lead to the diabetic epidemic that is present across much of the Western Pacific, reaching and affecting the people of Kira Kira.

Logging has been a controversial industry on KiraKira, with concerns expressed in the local community, that natural resources were being harvested without any demonstrable benefit being returned to the local community. RAMSI (Regional Assistance Mission for Solomon Islands) has built a number of new homes for the resident police force near the airport. The roads are not sealed and found only along the northern coastline of Makira Island on either side of KiraKira. The aid money from RAMSI has meant the construction of several new bridges which has made transport to KiraKira more accessible. There are only government-owned motor vehicles on Makira Island. There is a "bus" service which consists of a flat top truck, that travels back and forth along the road from dawn to dusk, which will stop and give passengers a lift, as long as they are willing to hang on tight for the roads are bumpy! The cost of a bus ride is $10SBD, but if not a local, they may charge a little bit more.

Kirakira is most known within Solomon Islands for its bananas. There are over 100 different varieties of banana. There are cooking, eating, green, yellow, fat, short and skinny bananas. A brief walk around any market place will give the chance to try and taste a wonderful fresh banana. The community is recognising the importance of the banana to Makira Island by holding the first banana festival.

Tourism 
Kirakira is "off the beaten track" and receives very few visitors. There is a strong desire to develop tourism as a much need source of sustainable revenue for the Kirakira community. There are unique surfing breaks on Makira Island with its black beaches and wonderful snorkelling particularly in the islands just off Kirakira. There are sandy beaches surrounded by opalescent waters at the "Three Sisters" island group and Ugi Island. These waters are dotted with coral reefs with an exhilarating variety and species of tropical fish. The islands can be accessed by an outboard motor boat that takes about 45–60 minutes from Kirakira harbour. For a group of 3–6 people, the cost of boat hire, a couple of guides and petrol for a day trip is around $1500–1800 SBD. Ihere are many exciting bird-watching trails. There are also some very interesting villages to visit. Perhaps most interesting of all is the fact that in the 21st century people are still living a traditional village-based life. In this remote province, people still predominantly live in houses built with thatched palm fronds.  The society is filled with local Kastoms that are refreshingly untouched by the busyness of the rest of the world.

Visitors need to take some precautions to minimise the risk of catching malaria. These include taking appropriate chemoprophylaxis (either daily doxycycline or weekly chloroquinine) and reducing the risk of being bitten by mosquitoes by wearing long sleeved shirts, using insect repellant at dusk and sleeping under a mosquito net wherever possible. In the inland river systems there are saltwater crocodiles and there have been many instances of swimmers being bitten. There is no TV, no Facebook and no e-mail access. There is reasonable mobile phone access in Kirakira and one can send a short SMS. The most relaxing part of any visit to Kirakira is the freedom from the continuous cycle of news and being accessible to work that invades all aspects of life in the more developed world.

Health care 
There is a small 30-bed hospital in KiraKira. There is only one full-time government-employed doctor based at the hospital who is supported by a team of about 40 dedicated nursing staff. There are two staff on a 2-year exchange program from Japan, that includes  a registered nurse and  a physiotherapist. With very limited resources, the hospital provides very effective health care to the community. Children have access to a comprehensive immunisation schedule and there are midwives who provide antenatal care and assist with deliveries. There is the capacity to manage infectious diseases such as TB and malaria, which are common in KiraKira, with access to the appropriate medications to treat these infectious illnesses. Malaria remains an endemic problem. Over the summer of 2013/2014, approximately 75% of confirmed malaria cases were due to Plasmodium vivax and 25% of cases were due to the more dangerous Plasmodium falciparum.

The hospital does have plain radiography and an ultrasound machine and there is access to a very limited number of blood tests. The hospital's pharmacy has good supplies of antibiotics, anti-malarials and a limited supply of analgesics and cardiorespiratory medications. There are oxygen cylinders. Ketamine sedation is available and allows for the doctor on the island to do a range of minor procedures such as drainage of abscesses and setting of simple fractures. There is an operating theatre. Complex cases are referred to the National Referral Hospital in Honiara and can be transported on one of the commercial flights that leaves the island each week. Patients who present for care will often have been bought by their family for a medical consultation after trekking for two or three days to see the doctor. The most common cause of trauma in Kirakira is falling from a coconut tree. From a young age, children and men climb coconut trees to try and harvest a few coconuts or simply because they are thirsty and would like a drink. They are often 5 or 6 metres above the ground and when they fall it is the cause of many broken bones.

The population of Makira province is growing rapidly because of a very high birth rate. Women usually has an average of six children with a very high teenage pregnancy rate. There are efforts by the Health Service to encourage women after their fourth child to consider having a tubal ligation or for their husbands to have a vasectomy. There are also efforts to try and provide better secondary education for young girls to try to reduce the number of teenage pregnancies. There is still much to be done to try to help the people of Makira province make progress towards the Millennium Goals for Maternal and Child Health. A grant from AusAide allowed for completion of an eye clinic facility at the hospital. It was opened by Andrew Byrnes, the Australian High Commissioner to Solomon Islands, on 28 February 2014.

There are some conditions, readily treated in developed nations, such as renal failure and cancer, for which there is no treatment available in KiraKira.

Bond University in Kirakira 
Since the beginning of 2013, Australian final year medical students have been completing placements on KiraKira from Bond University. In 2014, the university received funding from the Australian government, through Health Workforce Australia, to allow physiotherapy, urban design and nutrition students to also complete work placements in Kirakira. The project has been very successful and for the last four years has continued to receive support from the Australian government through the New Colombo Plan. In 2018, the project was expanded to included law students. The project received a Faculty of Health Sciences and Medicine award for making an outstanding contribution to student learning in 2017. Over the last five years, there have been almost 200 students from across the university and 50 academic supervisors involved in a project that has provided direct aid and support to the community.

The students and university staff have stayed at the Freshwinds Guest House in KiraKira. This provides single rooms with an en-suite and dinner and breakfast for about $90 AUD per night and is very comfortable. Students from other faculties of the university have visited KiraKira and completed repairs of the hospital's pharmacy and repainted the birthing suite, with a plan that further aid efforts and improvements would follow in 2014. A group of students formed a charity called The Strong Island Foundation which has raised several thousand dollars for the community of KiraKira and plans to expand on the good work to date.

Several research papers have been published from the work conducted in Kirakira. These include a paper describing peer-to-peer supervision as a novel way of students being able to academically and practically support one another in this remote community. There have also been papers published on antenatal care, an audit of the obstetric ward, on coconut tree injuries sustained by children and a paper that highlights the high perinatal mortality rate of 31 per 1,000 live born deliveries that is an ongoing health problem in the remote provinces of Kirakira.

Climate

References

Populated places in the Solomon Islands